Sociedade da Grã-Ordem Kavernista Apresenta Sessão das 10 (Society of the Kavernist Great-Order Presents the 10 o'clock Session) is the second album by the Brazilian rock musician Raul Seixas. The album is credited to him and also to Sérgio Sampaio, Edy Star and Miriam Batucada.

Track listing

Personnel 
 Raul Seixas – vocal on "Êta Vida", "Eu Vou Botar Pra Ferver", "Quero Ir", "Aos Trancos e Barrancos", "Dr. Paxeco" and "Finale (vinheta)"
 Sérgio Sampaio – vocal on "Êta Vida", "Eu Vou Botar Pra Ferver", "Quero Ir", "Eu Acho Graça", "Todo Mundo Está Feliz" and "Finale (vinheta)"
 Edy Star – vocal on "Sessão das 10", "Eu Não Quero Dizer Nada" and "Finale (vinheta)"
 Miriam Batucada – vocal on "Chorinho Inconsequente", "Soul Tabarôa" and "Finale (vinheta)"

References

Raul Seixas albums
1971 albums